Mirny is a rural locality (a settlement) in Bryansky District, Bryansk Oblast, Russia. The population was 213 as of 2010. There are 6 streets.

Geography 
Mirny is located 71 km east of Glinishchevo (the district's administrative centre) by road. Zhurinichi and Zaytsev Dvor are the nearest rural localities.

References 

Rural localities in Bryansky District